Bantia pygmaea is a species of praying mantis in the family Thespidae.

See also
List of mantis genera and species

References

pygmaea
Insects described in 1872